The Last Curtain is a 1937 British crime film directed by David MacDonald and starring Campbell Gullan, Kenne Duncan and Greta Gynt. The film blends drama and comedy and its plot follows an insurance investigator who examines a series of robberies that have taken place. Much of the action takes place backstage at the fictitious Trafalgar Theatre.

It was made at Pinewood Studios as a quota quickie. The film's sets were designed by John Bryan. It was the first film for comedy actor Joss Ambler who went on to star with such comedy stalwarts as George Formby and Will Hay.

Cast
 Campbell Gullan as Sir Alan Masterville
 Kenne Duncan as Joe Garsatti
 Greta Gynt as Julie Rendle
 John Wickham as Bob Fenton
 Sara Seegar as Molly
 Joss Ambler as Ellis
 W.G. Fay as Milligam
 Eric Hales as Barrington
 Mervyn Johns as Hemp

References

Bibliography
 Low, Rachael. Filmmaking in 1930s Britain. George Allen & Unwin, 1985.
 Wood, Linda. British Films, 1927-1939. British Film Institute, 1986.

External links
 

1937 films
1937 crime films
British crime films
Films directed by David MacDonald (director)
Films shot at Pinewood Studios
Films produced by Anthony Havelock-Allan
Films set in London
Quota quickies
British black-and-white films
British and Dominions Studios films
1930s English-language films
1930s British films